UL16 binding protein 3 (ULBP3) is a cell surface glycoprotein encoded by ULBP3 gene located on the chromosome 6. ULBP3 is related to MHC class I molecules, but its gene maps outside the MHC locus. The domain structure of ULBP3 differs significantly from those of conventional MHC class I molecules. It does not contain the α3 domain and the transmembrane segment. ULBP3 is thus composed of only the α1α2 domain which is linked to the cell membrane by the GPI anchor. It functions as a stress-induced ligand for NKG2D receptor.

References

Further reading